Avdankasy (Avtankassi) is a rural locality (a village) in Shatmaposinskoye Rural Settlement of Morgaushsky District, Chuvashia, Russia. The population was 180 as of 2012. There are 5 streets.

Geography 
Avdankasy is located 16 km southeast of Morgaushi (the district's administrative centre) by road. Shatmaposi is the nearest rural locality.

References 

Rural localities in Chuvashia
Yadrinsky Uyezd